Loburg is a town and former municipality in the Jerichower Land district, in Saxony-Anhalt, Germany. It is situated on the river Ehle, north of Zerbst. Since 1 January 2009, it is part of the town Möckern.

Towns in Saxony-Anhalt
Former municipalities in Saxony-Anhalt
Möckern
Fläming Heath